Ashburne Hall (to which Sheavyn House is an annex) is a University of Manchester hall of residence for students on the Fallowfield Campus, situated 2 miles (3.2 km) south of the main university campus (the Oxford Road Campus). The hall has catered accommodation offered to mainly undergraduate students, though some places are reserved for postgraduate students.

History
Ashburne Hall was founded in 1900 by Samuel Alexander, R. D. Darbishire, C. P. Scott and Alice B. Cooke as a hall of residence for women students. (Two halls for men had already been founded in association with Owens College.) It was first located at Ashburne House in Victoria Park (donated by R. D. Darbishire for the purpose) and remained there until the removal to "The Oaks" (which was then renamed Ashburne Hall) in 1910. The new site was on Wilmslow Road at the corner of Old Hall Lane, Fallowfield.

By 1930 the hall had been extended by new buildings and enriched by the bequest from Lord Morley of his personal library. At a later date Sheavyn House was built in the grounds and commemorates Dr Sheavyn who had been the third warden of the hall.

Ashburne Hall became a Grade II listed building on 8 June 2012.

Norman Gillson is the current warden of Ashburne Hall.

Notable students
 Alison Uttley, writer, who left money to support students at Ashburne Hall

Notable staff
 Elizabeth French, former warden
 Barbara Gwyer, later Principal of St Hugh's College, Oxford, was Vice-Warden of the hall from 1910 to 1916

See also

Listed buildings in Manchester-M14

References

External links
 

University of Manchester halls of residence
Grade II listed buildings in Manchester
Grade II listed educational buildings
Grade II listed residential buildings